The 2017 Brussels Summit of the North Atlantic Treaty Organization (NATO) was the 28th formal meeting of the heads of state and heads of government of the North Atlantic Treaty Organization, held in Brussels, Belgium, on 25 May 2017.

Agenda
There had been multiple competing agendas leading up to the summit, with Southern European members concerned with security in North Africa and the Middle East and the European migrant crisis and Eastern European members concerned more about Russia's policies. There was also concern about the Russia–Turkey relationship. Donald Trump, the President of the United States, urged the NATO members to meet the 2014 agreement to seek to spend at least two percent of their gross domestic product on defense. According to at least one senior White House official, Donald Trump had expressed interest in inviting Russia to the G7 summit and was considering leaving the NATO alliance. During the opening ceremony of the new NATO headquarters building, President Trump gave a speech which did not mention Article 5 of the North Atlantic Treaty, surprising H. R. McMaster, the National Security Advisor, James Mattis, the United States Secretary of Defense, and Rex Tillerson, the United States Secretary of State, who had approved a different speech that explicitly included the collective security commitment.

Accomplishments
NATO was set to become a full member of the Global Coalition, alongside NATO pledging to increase its support to the Coalition. A terrorism intelligence cell was agreed to be set up within the new intelligence division, which is intended to improve the sharing of information between members.

The Alliance leaders agreed to submit national action plans by December, which were to set out how members intend to meet the pledge to spend at least two percent of their GDP on defense by 2024.

Montenegro, represented by the prime minister Duško Marković, joined the meeting, days before it was to officially become a member of the organization on 5 June 2017. The possibility of NATO membership was said to remain open to other states.

Aftermath
A few days after, also following a G7 meeting, German Chancellor Angela Merkel told a crowd in a Bavarian beer hall that "we Europeans must really take our fate into our own hands – of course in friendship with the United States of America, in friendship with Great Britain and as good neighbors wherever that is possible also with other countries, even with Russia. But we have to know that we must fight for our future on our own, for our destiny as Europeans."

Future summits
The next major summit (29th) was to take place in Istanbul, Turkey in 2018. However, Germany, France, the Netherlands and Denmark have reportedly led a drive to block it.

On 20 October 2017 the NATO Secretary General announces that the 29th summit would be on 11 and 12 July 2018 in Brussels.

Leaders and other dignitaries in attendance

Member states

Non-member states and organisations
  – Prime Minister Duško Marković

References

External links 
NATO leaders agree to do more to fight terrorism and ensure fairer burden sharing

2017 conferences
2017 in Brussels
2017 in international relations
21st-century diplomatic conferences (NATO)
Belgium and NATO
Diplomatic conferences in Belgium
Events in Brussels
May 2017 events in Europe
NATO summits